Director General (DG) is the head of the Indian National Security Guard (NSG), the federal contingency deployment force that was created to deal with terrorism in India. The DG is selected by the Home Minister (MHA). In the first thirty-one years since its creation in 1984, the NSG has had twenty-eight DGs, with an average tenure of one year and few months. All the selected DGs have been officers from the Indian Police Service (IPS).

Director General of NSG(essentially from IPS) is equivalent in rank to a lieutenant general in the Army, an air marshal in the Air Force, or a vice admiral in the Navy, all three-star ranks.

The Director General is assisted, for administrative matters, by four IG Rank officers drawn from the Indian Police Service and also from the Indian Army of whom two are Inspectors General each for Administration and Headquarters (HQ) who in turn are assisted by Deputy Inspectors General. The Financial Advisor of the NSG has been an  officer of the rank of Joint Secretary from one of the Central Accounts Services and also has Dy Advisors from these Central Accounts Services.

List of Directors General

References
17.https://www.livemint.com/news/india/ma-ganapathy-appointed-nsg-chief-kuldiep-singh-to-head-crpf-11615913486684.html

Specialist law enforcement agencies of India